The 2015 All-Ireland Senior Hurling Championship was the 129th staging of the All-Ireland championship since its establishment by the Gaelic Athletic Association in 1887. The draw for the 2015 fixtures took place on 9 October 2014 live on RTÉ2. The championship began on 3 May 2015 and ended on 6 September 2015.

Kilkenny were the defending champions and successfully retained the title following a 1–22 to 1–18 defeat of Galway.

Teams

Summary

Championships

Changes from 2014 Championship
Penalties must now be struck on or behind the 20 metre line and only the goalkeeper is allowed on the goal line. Previously 3 defenders were allowed.	

If a foul has been committed the referee can allow play to continue for up to 5 seconds if he considers it to be to the advantage of the offended team. Previously there was no advantage rule in hurling.

Leinster Senior Hurling Championship

Qualifier group

2015 Leinster Senior Hurling Championship

Munster Senior Hurling Championship

Match Details

All-Ireland Qualifiers

Round 1 
The teams beaten in the Leinster and Munster quarter-finals and semi-finals of the provincial championships play each other. The draw was held on 22 June.

Round 2 
The four winners of Round 1 play in two games. The draw was held on 6 July.

All-Ireland Senior Hurling Championship 
{{8TeamBracket-Compact-NoSeeds-Byes
| RD1= Quarter-finals 
| RD2= Semi-finals
| RD3= Final
| team-width= 100
| score-width= 35
| RD1-team01=  Waterford
| RD1-score01= 2-21
| RD1-team02=  Dublin
| RD1-score02= 1-19

| RD1-team07=  Galway
| RD1-score07= 2-28
| RD1-team08=  Cork 
| RD1-score08= 0-22

| RD2-team01=  Kilkenny
| RD2-score01= 1-21
| RD2-team02=  Waterford
| RD2-score02= 0-18
| RD2-team03= Tipperary| RD2-score03= 3-16
| RD2-team04= Galway| RD2-score04= 0-26| RD3-team01=  Kilkenny| RD3-score01= 1-22| RD3-team02=  Galway
| RD3-score02= 0-18
}}

 Quarter-finals 
The beaten finalists in the Leinster and Munster championships play the winners of Round 2 in two "quarter-finals".	

 Semi-finals 

The Leinster and Munster provincial champions play the winners of the two quarter-finals.

 Final 

Statistics
All scores correct as of September 9, 2015

Scoring

First goal of the championship:
 Neil McManus for Antrim against Laois (3 May 2015)
Widest winning margin: 24 points Kilkenny 5-25 – 0-16  Wexford (Leinster semi-final)
Most goals in a match:  8 Antrim 5-17 – 3-22  Laois (Leinster group stage)
Most points in a match: 50 Laois 0-29 – 0-21  Offaly (Leinster quarter-final)
 Galway 2-28 – 0-22  Cork (All-Ireland quarter-final)
Most goals by one team in a match: 5 Antrim 5-17 – 3-22  Laois (Leinster group stage)
 Galway 5-19 – 1-18  Dublin (Leinster quarter-final replay)
 Kilkenny 5-25 – 0-16  Wexford (Leinster semi-final)
 Highest aggregate score: 63 Antrim 5-17 – 3-22  Laois (Leinster group stage)
Lowest aggregate score:  31 Westmeath 1-21 – 1-7  Antrim (Leinster group stage)
Most goals scored by a losing team: 3 Antrim 5-17 – 3-22  Laois (Leinster group stage)
 Galway 0-26 – 3-16  Tipperary (All-Ireland semi-final)

Top scorers
Overall

Single game

Clean sheets

Miscellaneous

 Galway record their first ever championship defeat of Dublin.	
 Laois secure their first championship victory over Offaly since 1972.

 Attendances 
Highest attendances:
  Kilkenny 1-22 – 1-18  Galway (Croke Park) - 82,300	
  Tipperary 3-16 – 0-26  Galway (Croke Park) - 58,495	
  Waterford 0-16 – 0-21  Tipperary (Semple Stadium) - 43,084	
  Kilkenny 1-21 – 0-18  Waterford (Croke Park) - 41,112 Galway 2-28 – 0-22  Cork (Semple Stadium) - 33,150Total attendance: 567,622Average attendance: 25,801'Broadcasting
These matches were broadcast live on television in Ireland

Awards
Sunday Game Team of the YearThe Sunday Game team of the year was picked on 6 September, which was the night of the final. The panel consisting of Donal Óg Cusack, Henry Shefflin, Anthony Daly, Michael Duignan, Ger Loughnane, Liam Sheedy and Cyril Farrell unanimously selected Kilkenny's TJ Reid as the Sunday game player of the year.	

Colm Callanan (Galway)
Paul Murphy (Kilkenny)
Joey Holden (Kilkenny)
Cathal Barrett (Tipperary)
Daithí Burke (Galway)
Tadhg de Búrca (Waterford)
Cillian Buckley (Kilkenny)
Michael Fennelly (Kilkenny)
David Burke (Galway)
Jonathan Glynn (Galway)
Richie Hogan (Kilkenny)
TJ Reid (Kilkenny)
Ger Aylward (Kilkenny)
Seamus Callanan (Tipperary)
Maurice Shanahan (Waterford)

All Star Team of the Year
On 5 November, the 2015 All Star Award'' winners were announced with the awards ceremony being held on 6 November in the National Convention Centre in Dublin.
All Ireland champions Kilkenny have seven award winners with runners-up Galway receiving four awards. Winning an award for the first time were Colm Callanan, Joey Holden, Daithi Burke, Tadhg de Burca, Cathal Mannion, Ger Aylward and Maurice Shanahan.

T. J. Reid of Kilkenny was named as the All Stars Hurler of the Year with Tadhg de Búrca of Waterford being named as the All Stars Young Hurler of the Year.

References

External links
Full list of fixtures

2015 in hurling